The Modern Language Journal is a peer-reviewed academic journal published by Wiley-Blackwell on behalf of the National Federation of Modern Language Teachers Associations. It covers research and discussion about the learning and teaching of foreign and second languages.

Types of articles published include documented essays, research studies using quantitative/qualitative methodologies, response articles, and editorials that challenge paradigms of language learning and teaching. The journal has a News & Notes of the Profession section offering a calendar of events, professional announcements, initiatives, and concerns. The journal also provides a list of relevant articles in other professional journals, and reviews of scholarly books, monographs, and computer software. An annual survey of doctoral degrees granted in foreign languages, literatures, cultures, linguistics, and foreign language education in the United States is available on the journal's website.

Since 2007, the journal issues a fifth issue in addition to the regular four issues published every year. This additional issue is a focus issue or a monograph in alternating years.

According to the Journal Citation Reports, the journal has a 1789
 impact factor of 1.745.

Editorial board
Editor-in-Chief: Marta Antón
Associate Editor: Shawn Loewen
Associate Editor: Wander Lowie
Associate Editor: Martha Bigelow

Board
Teresa Cadierno
Laura Collins
 Kees de Bot
Patricia Duff
Agnes He
Elaine K. Horwitz
Richard Kern
James Lantolf
Jenifer Larson-Hall
Constant Leung
Peter MacIntyre
Junko Mori
Rosa Manchón
Tim McNamara
Rebecca Oxford
Angela Scarino
Merrill Swain
Naoko Taguchi
Elaine Tarone
Paul Toth
Ema Ushioda
Guadalupe Valdés
Paula Winke

See also
List of linguistics journals

References

External links 
 

Linguistics journals
Wiley-Blackwell academic journals
English-language journals
Quarterly journals
Publications established in 1916